The 2003 D.C. United season was the clubs' ninth year of existence, as well as their seventh season in Major League Soccer.

Led by Ray Hudson, D.C. United's 2003 campaign was highlighted by the club's return to the MLS Cup Playoffs, their first postseason appearance since 1999. In the playoffs, United who didn't qualify for the playoffs until the final day of the regular season, took on the Eastern Conference regular season champions, Chicago Fire. The Fire defeated United 4–0 on aggregates in the conference semifinals, winning each leg by a 2–0 margin of victory.

Background

Review

April

May

June

July

August

September

October

November 
On November 1, 2003, D.C. United played their first playoff match in nearly four years, entering the 2003 MLS Cup Playoffs as the fourth seed in the Eastern Conference. In the Conference semifinals, United faced the Eastern Conference regular season champions, Chicago Fire. The two-match, aggregate series  was first contested at United's RFK Stadium. The match ended in a 2–0 defeat thanks to goals from the Fire's Andy Williams and Ante Razov in the 4th and 94th minutes, respectively.

A week later, on November 9, 2003, the second leg was played at Chicago Fire's Soldier Field, where the Fire defeated United by the same 2–0 scoreline, thus ultimately winning the series 4–0 on aggregate, and advancing to the Eastern Conference championship. The defeat ended United's playoff campaign and their season altogether.

Non-competitive

Preseason exhibitions

Midseason exhibitions

Competitive

Overall

Major League Soccer

Standings 
Eastern Conference

Overall table

Results summary

Results by round

Match results

MLS Cup Playoffs

U.S. Open Cup

Club

Statistics

Appearances and goals 
Numbers after plus–sign (+) denote appearances as a substitute.

Transfers

MLS SuperDraft picks 

D.C. United made a total of seven selections in the 2003 MLS Draft. Five of the draft picks were ultimately signed for the 2003 season.

See also 
 2003 in American soccer
 2003 Major League Soccer season
 2003 U.S. Open Cup
 D.C. United
 List of D.C. United seasons

References 

2003
Dc United
Dc United
2003 in sports in Washington, D.C.